Luo Union may refer to:
 Luo Union (Welfare Organisation) - An defunct East African welfare organisation that united Luo peoples
 Luo Union F.C. - A defunct Kenyan football club organised by the welfare organisation
 Gor Mahia FC - A Kenyan football club